The Daryl and Ossie Cartoon Show is an Australian afternoon children's television block aired on the Nine Network in 1977 every weekday at 4pm. It was hosted by Daryl Somers and Ossie Ostrich played by Ernie Carroll.

Nine Network original programming
Australian children's television series
Australian television shows featuring puppetry
1977 Australian television series debuts
1977 Australian television series endings